Giulio Cerreti (1903–1985) was an Italian politician.  He was born in Sesto Fiorentino.

1903 births
1985 deaths
People from Sesto Fiorentino
Italian Communist Party politicians
Members of the Constituent Assembly of Italy
Deputies of Legislature I of Italy
Deputies of Legislature II of Italy
Deputies of Legislature III of Italy
Politicians of Tuscany